The stellate tadpole-goby (Benthophilus stellatus) is a species of gobiid fish native to the basin of the Sea of Azov where it occurs in the Gulf of Taganrog and limans of the eastern coast. It also lives in the lower Don River up to the Tsimlyansk Reservoir. Males can reach a length of  TL while females only reach  TL.

The Caspian stellate tadpole-goby (Benthophilus leobergius) has been considered a subspecies of this species.

See also
Benthophilus magistri, the Azov tadpole goby

References

External links
 Пуголовка звездчатая (Benthophilus stellatus (Sauvage, 1874) Рыбы вод Украины.  fish.kiev.ua

 B. stellatus  (Sauvage, 1874) - звездчатая пуголовка Позвоночные животные России  www.sevin.ru

Benthophilus
Freshwater fish of Europe
Fish of Europe
Fish of Russia
Fish described in 1874